Portraits from a Fire is the first narrative feature film written and directed by a Tsilhqot'in filmmaker.

Portraits from a Fire is a Canadian comedy-drama film, directed by Trevor Mack and released in 2021. The film stars William Magnus Lulua as Tyler, an amateur filmmaker living with his father Gord (Nathaniel Arcand) on a Tsilhqotʼin reserve in northern British Columbia, whose life is upended following the revelation of a long-hidden family secret.

The film was shot in 2019 on Tl'etinqox-t'in territory around the community of Anaham. Mack has indicated that the film was inspired by a desire to tell a First Nations story that had nothing to do with colonialism or the Indian residential school system, as well as by a desire to reclaim the Tsilhqot’in language, which during his early life was typically spoken by people in the community only when they needed to discuss something they did not want their children to hear or understand. Many of the supporting roles in the film are performed by local residents of Anaham rather than professional actors.

The film had its official theatrical premiere on October 3, 2021 at the 2021 Vancouver International Film Festival, although it was screened on the online platforms of the 2021 Cinéfest Sudbury International Film Festival and the FIN Atlantic Film Festival in September. It was also selected as the opening film of the 2021 Edmonton International Film Festival, and was screened at the 2021 ImagineNATIVE Film and Media Arts Festival, and the 2021 American Indian Film Festival.

It premiered commercially on November 1.

Awards 
Best Canadian Feature Film - 2021 Edmonton International Film Festival
Best B.C. Emerging Filmmaker: Trevor Mack - 2021 Vancouver International Film Festival
Best Director: Trevor Mack - 2021 American Indian Film Festival
Best Supporting Actor: Asivak Koostachin - 2021 American Indian Film Festival
B.C. Emerging Filmmaker Award: Trevor Mack - 2021 Vancouver International Film Festival
Kevin Tierney Emerging Producer Award: Kate Kroll, Trevor Mack, Rylan Friday - 2021 Indiescreen Awards
Best British Columbia Film - 2021 Vancouver Film Critics Circle
One to Watch: Trevor Mack - 2021 Vancouver Film Critics Circle
Best Picture - 2022 Leo Awards
Best Direction: Trevor Mack - 2022 Leo Awards
Best Cinematography: Kaayla Wachell - 2022 Leo Awards
Best Score: Conan Karpinski & Andrew Dixon - 2022 Leo Awards
Best Editing: Elad Tzadok - 2022 Leo Awards

It was a nominee for the DGC Discovery Award at the 2021 Directors Guild of Canada awards.

References

External links

2021 films
2021 comedy-drama films
Canadian comedy-drama films
First Nations films
Films shot in British Columbia
Films set in British Columbia
2020s Canadian films